Jesús Vaquero Crespo (1950 – 17 April 2020) was a Spanish neurosurgeon. He was a pioneer in the treatment of medullary injuries.

Biography 
Born in Madrid in 1950, he became chief of Neurosurgery of the Hospital Puerta de Hierro in 1992. He was also full professor of the Autonomous University of Madrid (UAM) and also held the Chair of Neuroscience of the Rafael del Pino Foundation.

He died on 17 April 2020 due to COVID-19.

Decorations 
 Great Cross of the Order of the Dos de Mayo (2017)

References 

Spanish neurosurgeons
Academic staff of the Autonomous University of Madrid
1950 births
2020 deaths
Deaths from the COVID-19 pandemic in Spain